Lisa Block de Behar (Montevideo, Uruguay) is an Uruguayan professor of Linguistics and researcher in Literary Theory, Comparative Literature and Communication media.

She holds a PhD from École des hautes études en sciences sociales in Paris where she wrote a thesis about the Rhetoric of Silence. She was the director at the School of Communication, Universidad de la República, Uruguay, and professor of Semiotics and Theory of interpretation at the same Institution. She taught Linguistics and Literary Theory at the Instituto de Profesores Artigas (IPA). Currently she is professor of Analysis of Communication at the Facultad de Información y Comunicación, Universidad de la República.

Her dissertation was published in Mexico titled Una retórica del silencio and won the Xavier Villaurrutia Award in 1984. She has been visiting professor and lectured on semiotics, linguistics, literary theory, comparative literature, hermeneutics on different subjects at North-American, European, Latin-American an Israeli Universities. She was awarded two times the Fulbright Commission scholarship, was a fellow of the John Simon Guggenheim Memorial Foundation, and of the Institute for Advanced Studies at Bloomington University, Indiana.

Her most recent research is concerned with a poetics of disappearance, in relation to space and writing, a rhetoric of discursive negativity and how hermeneutics imagines literality. Block de Behar observes the transformation of the connection between showing and telling and the uncertainties that technology introduces in literary discourse and daily communication. The incidences of Jewish culture and thought are very present in Block de Behar's research.

She is the author and editor of books on Louis Auguste Blanqui's cosmological phantasmagoria as well as on Jorge Luis Borges, Adolfo Bioy Casares, Haroldo de Campos, Felisberto Hernández, Jules Laforgue, Carlos Real de Azúa and Emir Rodríguez Monegal.

In 2002 she received the Alexander von Humboldt Stiftung "Prize Research Award"  and in 2011 she was nominated Emeritus Professor of Spanish, Instituto de Profesores Artigas Montevideo, Uruguay, where she herself was a student and taught as  professor.

In 2017 she was awarded Doctor Honoris Causa by the Universidad de la República, Uruguay.

DIGITAL LIBRARIES

With the collaboration of colleagues and graduate students she created and is developing different digital libraries at the site Anaforas:

Biblioteca digital de autores uruguayos

Publicaciones periódicas del Uruguay

Figuras

Bibliography

 Derroteros literarios. Temas y autores que se cruzan en tierras del Uruguay. Universidad de la República/CSIC, Montevideo, 2015
 Borges, The Passion of an Endless Quotation. SUNY Press. Second Edition, New York, 2014
 Borges, Bioy, Blanqui y las leyendas del nombre. Siglo XXI Editores, México, 2011
 Medios, pantallas y otros lugares comunes. Sobre cambios e intercambios verbales y visuales en tiempos mediáticos, Katz, Buenos Aires, 2009
 Adriana Contreras. Fragmentos de obra (en colaboración con Haroldo de Campos), Albedrío, México, 2001
 Borges. La pasión de una cita sin fin, Siglo XXI Editores, México, 1999. Trad. inglesa: Borges. The passion of an endless quotation, SUNY Press, New York, 2002
 Borges ou les gestes d'un voyant aveugle, Champion, París, 1998
 Una palabra propiamente dicha, Siglo XXI Editores, México y Buenos Aires, 1994
 Dos medios entre dos medios. Sobre la representación y sus dualidades, Siglo XXI Editores, México y Buenos Aires, 1990
 Jules Laforgue o las metáforas del desplazamiento, Montevideo, 1987. Trad. francesa: Jules Laforgue. Les métaphores du déplacement, L'Harmattan, París, 2004
 Al margen de Borges, Siglo XXI Editores. Buenos Aires y México, 1987. Trad. italiana: Al margine di Borges, Edizioni dal Sud, Bari, 1997
 Una retórica del silencio. Funciones del lector y procedimientos de la lectura literaria, Siglo XXI Editores, México, 1984. Trad. inglesa: A rhetoric of silence and other selected writings, Mouton De Gruyter, Berlín, 1995
 El lenguaje de la publicidad, Siglo XXI Editores, México y Buenos Aires, 1973
 Análisis de un lenguaje en crisis. Recursos del humor verbal en la narrativa latinoamericana contemporánea, Nuestra tierra, Montevideo, 1969

Editions, forewords and translations

 Louis-Auguste Blanqui: L'Éternité par les astres. Seconde édition avec amendements at ajouts, édité avec une introduction et notes par Lisa Block de Behar, Slatkine, Genève, 2009
 Haroldo de Campos, Don de poesía: ensayos críticos sobre su obra. Coordinación de Lisa Block de Behar, Linardi & Risso, Montevideo, 2009
 Cine y totalitarismo. Lisa Block de Behar & Eduardo Rinesi (Editores), La Crujía, Buenos Aires, 2007
 France - Amérique latine: Croisements de lettres et de voies. Sous la direction de Walter Bruno Berg & Lisa Block de Behar, L'Harmattan, París, 2007
 Emir Rodríguez Monegal: Obra selecta. Prólogo y antología de Lisa Block de Behar, Biblioteca Ayacucho, Caracas, 2003
 Entre mitos & conocimiento. Coordinación y prólogo de de Lisa Block de Behar, ICLA, Montevideo, 2003
 Comparative Literature Worldwide / La littérature comparée dans le monde. Vol. II. Editor Lisa Block de Behar, ICLA, Montevideo, 2000
 Louis-Auguste Blanqui: La eternidad a través de los astros. Traducción y prólogo de Lisa Block de Behar, Siglo XXI Editores, México, 2000
 Escrito sobre el cine. Edición y prólogo de Lisa Block de Behar, CSIC, Montevideo, 1997
 Louis-Auguste Blanqui: L'Éternité par les astres. Préface de Lisa Block de Behar, Slatkine, París/Genève, 1996
 De la amistad y otras coincidencias: Adolfo Bioy Casares en el Uruguay. Coordinación de Lisa Block de Behar e Isidra Solari, CCIS, Montevideo, 1993
 Lautréamont y Laforgue: La cuestión de los orígenes/La quête des origines. Editado por Lisa Block de Behar, François Caradec y Daniel Lefort, Academia Nacional de Letras, Montevideo, 1993
 Christian Metz y la teoría del cine. Versión, Buenos Aires, 1992
 Términos de comparación. Los estudios literarios entre historias y teorías. Edición y prólogo de Lisa Block de Behar, Academia Nacional de Letras, Montevideo, 1991
 Diseminario. La desconstrucción, otro descubrimiento de América. Edición y prólogo de Lisa Block de Behar, xyz, Montevideo, 1987
 Emir Rodríguez Monegal. Homenaje. Edición y prólogo de Lisa Block de Behar. Ministerio de educación y cultura, Montevideo, 1987.
 Alberto Oreggioni, (dirección), Diccionario de literatura uruguaya, vol. 1, Arca, 1987, pages 108-109
 Gran Enciclopedia del Uruguay, vol. 1, El Observador, 2001, no page number
 Miguel Ángel Campodónico, Nuevo Diccionario de la Cultura Uruguaya, Librería Linardi y Risso, 2003, page 52

References

External links
 Personal website
 Publications

1937 births
People from Montevideo
School for Advanced Studies in the Social Sciences alumni
Linguists from Uruguay
Uruguayan Jews
Uruguayan translators
Living people